The 2018 Montana State Bobcats football team represented Montana State University as a member of the Big Sky Conference during the 2018 NCAA Division I FCS football season. Led by third-year head coach Jeff Choate, the Bobcats compiled an overall record of 8–5 with a mark of 5–3 in conference play, tying for fourth place in the Big Sky. Montana State received an at-large bid to the NCAA Division I Football Championship playoffs, where they defeated Incarnate Word in the first round before losing to the eventual national champion, North Dakota State, in the second round. The Bobcats played their home games at Bobcat Stadium in Bozeman, Montana.

Previous season
The Bobcats finished the 2017 season 5–6, 5–3 in Big Sky play to finish in a tie for sixth place.

Preseason

Polls
On July 16, 2018 during the Big Sky Kickoff in Spokane, Washington, the Bobcats were predicted to finish in eighth place in both the coaches and media poll.

Preseason All-Conference Team
The Bobcats had one player selected to the Preseason All-Conference Team.

Tucker Yates – Sr. DT

Schedule

Game summaries

Western Illinois

at South Dakota State

Wagner

at Portland State

Eastern Washington

Idaho

at Weber State

at Idaho State

Cal Poly

Northern Colorado

at Montana

FCS Playoffs

Incarnate Word–First Round

at North Dakota State–Second Round

Ranking movements

External links

References

Montana State
Montana State Bobcats football seasons
Bobcats
Montana State Bobcats football